Kateryna D. Makova is an American biologist, currently the Francis R. and Helen M. Pentz professor of biology in the Eberly College of Science at Pennsylvania State University. She is also a published author, being widely cited by her peers and widely held in libraries.

References

Year of birth missing (living people)
Living people
21st-century American biologists
Pennsylvania State University faculty